Myrtle Grove can refer to:
 Myrtle Grove, Bingley, United Kingdom
 Myrtle Grove, Youghal, Republic of Ireland
 Myrtle Grove, Florida, U.S.
 Myrtle Grove (Easton, Maryland), home on the U.S. National Register of Historic Places
 Myrtle Grove, North Carolina, in New Hanover County, U.S.
 Myrtle Grove Plantation, Tensas Parish, Louisiana, on the U.S. NRHP
 Myrtle Grove Plantation, Georgia, U.S.